Fred Towsley Murphy (October 23, 1872 – January 10, 1948) was an American football and baseball player and physician.  He played college football at Yale University from 1893 to 1896. He was named to the 1895 College Football All-America Team and the 1896 College Football All-America Team as a tackle.

Playing career
Murphy attended Yale University, where he played tackle for the school's football team.  He was selected as an All-American at that position in 1895.  In 1894, Murphy was injured in the Harvard–Yale football game that became known as the "Hampden Park Blood Bath."  The game had become increasingly brutal with the introduction of mass formation.  In the 1894 game, four players on each team suffered serious injuries, resulting in the cancellation of the football rivalry between the two schools.  Murphy was left unconscious for five hours in a hospital as a result of the beating he took in the game.

In addition to football, he also played on the Yale baseball team during his junior year.

Education and medical career
Murphy was educated at Phillips Academy, graduated from Yale with a Bachelor of Arts in 1897, and studied at Harvard Medical School (M.D. 1901). He was assistant in anatomy at the Harvard Medical School, 1903–4; Austin teaching fellow in surgery, 1905; visiting surgeon to the clinic, 1909–11, and assistant in surgery 1910–11. From 1904 to 1908 he was assistant surgeon at the Infants Hospital, Boston, and from 1907 to 1911 surgeon to out-patients at the Massachusetts General Hospital. In 1911 he was appointed professor of surgery at Washington University School of Medicine and, in 1914, chief surgeon of the Barnes Hospital and consulting surgeon of the City Hospital, St. Louis, but resigned in 1919 to become a practicing surgeon in Detroit. During the World War he was 'director and commanding officer of Base Hospital 21 in France (1917–8), and later was director of the medical and surgical department of the American Red Cross, representing the chief surgeon of the American Expeditionary Forces, with the rank of colonel. He was awarded the Distinguished Service Medal.

References

External links
 

1872 births
1948 deaths
19th-century players of American football
All-American college football players
American football tackles
Baseball players from Detroit
Harvard Medical School alumni
Phillips Academy alumni
Players of American football from Detroit
Washington University School of Medicine faculty
Yale Bulldogs football players
Yale Bulldogs baseball players